The Poison Control Center is an American indie rock band from Ames, Iowa.

The band's indie rock sound is strongly influenced by bands of the 1960s, such as The Beatles and The Beach Boys, but they have also touched upon more unrelated genres since their inception. Their earlier recordings show influence of the lo-fi sound and pop sensibilities of indie rock bands of the 1990s, such as Guided by Voices and Pavement, although recent albums have featured more polished production.

Discography
The Go-Go Music Show (2001)
Kennedy (2006)
Glory Us (2006)
A Collage Of Impressions (2007)
Sad Sour Future (2010)
Stranger Ballet (2011)

References

External links
 
 http://www.allmusic.com/artist/the-poison-control-center-mn0000636740/discography

Indie rock musical groups from Iowa
Alternative rock groups from Iowa